A mystery film is a genre of film that revolves around the solution of a problem or a crime. It focuses on the efforts of the detective, private investigator or amateur sleuth to solve the mysterious circumstances of an issue by means of clues, investigation, and clever deduction.

The plot often centers on the deductive ability, prowess, confidence, or diligence of the detective as he attempts to unravel the crime or situation by piecing together clues and circumstances, seeking evidence, interrogating witnesses, and tracking down a criminal. Mystery films can involve a supernatural mystery in which the solution does not have to be logical and even in which there is no crime involved.

Suspense is often maintained as an important plot element. This can be done through the use of the soundtrack, camera angles, heavy shadows, and surprising plot twists. Alfred Hitchcock used all of these techniques, but would sometimes allow the audience in on a pending threat then draw out the moment for dramatic effect.

This genre has ranged from early mystery tales, fictional or literary detective stories, to classic Hitchcockian suspense-thrillers to classic private detective films. A related film subgenre is spy films.

Definition and characteristics
Mystery films mainly focus on solving a crime or a puzzle. The mystery generally revolves around a murder which must then be solved by policemen, private detectives, or amateur sleuths. The viewer is presented with a series of likely suspects, some of whom are "red herrings," –persons who have the motive to commit the crime but did not actually do it–, and attempts to solve the puzzle along with the investigator. At times the viewer is presented with information not available to the main character. The central character usually explores the unsolved crime, unmasks the perpetrator, and puts an end to the effects of the villainy.

The successful mystery film adheres to one of two story types, known as Open and Closed. The Closed (or whodunit) mystery conceals the identity of the perpetrator until late in the story, adding an element of suspense during the apprehension of the suspect, as the audience is never quite sure who it is. The Open mystery (or howcatchem), in contrast, reveals the identity of the perpetrator at the top of the story, showcasing the "perfect crime" which the audience then watches the protagonist unravel, usually at the very end of the story, akin to the unveiling scenes in the Closed style.

Mystery novels have proven to be a good medium for translation into film. The sleuth often forms a strong leading character, and the plots can include elements of drama, suspense, character development, uncertainty, and surprise twists. The locales of the mystery tale are often of a mundane variety, requiring little in the way of expensive special effects. Successful mystery writers can produce a series of books based on the same sleuth character, providing rich material for sequels.

Until at least the 1980s, women in mystery films have often served a dual role, providing a relationship with the detective and frequently playing the part of woman-in-peril. The women in these films are often resourceful individuals, being self-reliant, determined and as often duplicitous. They can provide the triggers for the events that follow or serve as an element of suspense as helpless victims.

History

Literary influences

The earliest mystery films reach back to the silent era. The first detective film is often cited as Sherlock Holmes Baffled, a very short Mutoscope reel created between 1900 and 1903 by Arthur Marvin. It is the earliest-known film to feature the character of detective Sherlock Holmes, albeit in a barely recognisable form.

In France, the popular Nick Carter detective novels inspired the first film serial, Nick Carter, le roi des détectives (1908). This six-episode series was followed with Nouveaux aventures de Nick Carter in 1909. Louis Feuillade created the highly popular Fantômas (1913–14) serial based on the best-selling serial novel about a super-criminal pursued by a stubborn inspector Juve. Dujardin wears a mask and costume similar to Fantomas' in an apparent tribute in The Artist, a nostalgic 2011 film about silent cinema. Later detective serials by Feuillade include The Vampires (1915), Judex (1916), Tih Minh (1918), and Barrabas (1919). Feuillade's films, which combined realism, poetic imagery, and pure fantasy, influenced the American The Perils of Pauline (1914), directors such as René Clair, and Surrealists such as André Breton.

The earliest true mystery films include The Gold Bug (1910), also from France, and The Murders in the Rue Morgue (1914). Both are derived from stories by Edgar Allan Poe, which is appropriate as Poe is often credited with creating modern detective fiction as well as the first private detective character, C. Auguste Dupin. Universal Pictures renamed him Pierre Dupin in Murders in the Rue Morgue (1932), an atmospheric horror-mystery starring Bela Lugosi. The film was remade twice more in 1953 and 1971. Poe's second Dupin story, The Mystery of Marie Rogêt, was filmed in 1942. More recently, The Raven (2012) presented a fictionalized account of the last days of Poe's life. Here, the author pursues a mysterious serial killer whose murders are directly inspired by his stories.

Charles Dickens' unfinished novel The Mystery of Edwin Drood (1870) was completed by another author and eventually adapted to the screen. Two films, now believed lost, were made in 1909 and 1914. Universal produced The Mystery of Edwin Drood (1935). The story was remade again in 1993. Universal, known mostly for its long list of classic horror films, also created perhaps the first supernatural horror-whodunit hybrid with Night Monster (1942).

American author Mary Roberts Rinehart (1876–1958), is credited with inventing the "Had-I-But-Known" school of mystery writing (as well as the phrase, "The butler did it"). Her 1920 "old dark house" novel (and play) The Bat was filmed as The Bat (1926), as The Bat Whispers (1930), and a third time a remake, The Bat (1959), starring Vincent Price. Another movie based on a play, The Cat and the Canary (1927), pioneered the "comedy-mystery" genre. Remade several times, including a version with Bob Hope released in 1939.

Undoubtedly the most famous of the amateur detectives to appear on the silver screen is the archetypal Sherlock Holmes. Since 1903, Holmes has been portrayed by a multitude of actors in over 200 films. Perhaps the earliest detective comedy is Buster Keaton's Sherlock Jr. (1924). Until recently, the only American-made series starred Basil Rathbone and Nigel Bruce as Holmes and Dr. Watson. Together they made 14 films between 1939 and 1946. The first two, at 20th Century Fox, were period piece mysteries set in the late-Victorian era of the original stories. By the third film, Sherlock Holmes and the Voice of Terror (1942), now taken up by Universal Studios, Holmes was updated to the present day. Several films dealt with World War II and thwarting Nazi spies.

The crime novelist Dorothy L. Sayers (1893–1957) created the archetypal British aristocratic sleuth Lord Peter Wimsey in 1923. Peter Haddon first played Wimsey in The Silent Passenger (1935), written by Sayers specifically for the screen. This was followed by Busman's Honeymoon (1940), also released as Haunted Honeymoon, with Robert Montgomery as Wimsey. Later, Montgomery would also play Raymond Chandler's detective Philip Marlowe in The Lady in the Lake (1947).

Doubleday's The Crime Club imprint published a variety of mystery novels that also inspired a radio show. Universal Pictures struck a deal to produce a series of 11 Crime Club mystery films released from 1937 to 1939. These include The Westlake Case (1937) and Mystery of the White Room (1939).

Other literary sleuths who were brought to the screen include Charlie Chan, Ellery Queen, Nancy Drew, Nero Wolfe, and Agatha Christie's Miss Marple and Hercule Poirot. To date, 32 films and dozens of television adaptations have been made based

Classic period: the 1930s
A few silent Charlie Chan films, now lost, were produced in the 1920s. Starting in 1929, the B-picture unit at Fox Film Corporation (later part of 20th Century Fox) began a series of 28 commercially successful Charlie Chan films. (Monogram Pictures continued the series from 1944 to 1949 with 17 more entries.) The success of the Chan films led Fox to hire exiled actor Peter Lorre to play Japanese sleuth Mr. Moto in 8 films from 1937 to 1939. Monogram responded by creating their own gentlemanly Oriental detective, Mr. Wong, adapted from a Hugh Wiley story. Beginning with Mr. Wong, Detective, Boris Karloff played Wong in 5 of 6 films produced from 1938 to 1941.

Over at Warner Brothers studios, the Perry Mason novels by Erle Stanley Gardner were faithfully adapted into a series of six films from 1934 to 1937. Most of these placed the crusading attorney in a standard murder mystery whodunit story. Warner Bros. also created the Torchy Blane films which were notable for featuring one of the few female sleuths in a series. Starting with Smart Blonde, Glenda Farrell played the brassy, mystery-solving news reporter in 8 of 9 films made between 1936 and 1939. Another novel film is When Were You Born (1938) with Chinese actress Anna May Wong as an astrologer who helps solve a murder using her star-gazing talents.

RKO purchased the rights to a Hildegarde Withers story by Stuart Palmer and launched a six-film series starting with The Penguin Pool Murder (1932). Edna May Oliver played Withers, a schoolteacher with a yen for sleuthing who becomes involved with a police inspector. The last film was released in 1937.

The Philo Vance detective novels by S. S. Van Dine inspired 15 feature films released from 1929 to 1947. The Canary Murder Case (1929), starring William Powell as Vance, has been called the first modern detective film. Initially made as a silent movie, it was converted into a talkie halfway through production. (Co-star Louise Brooks was blacklisted by Paramount Pictures after famously refusing to return to Hollywood to dub her dialog.) Powell played the suave New York detective in the first three films. A pre-Sherlock Holmes Basil Rathbone played Vance in the 4th movie. Powell returned once more for the fifth feature, the highly regarded The Kennel Murder Case (1933) produced by Warner Brothers.

Powell then landed his signature role playing the equally debonair Nick Charles opposite Myrna Loy as his carefree wife "Nora" in the Thin Man series. Six films in all were produced by Metro-Goldwyn-Mayer from 1934 to 1947. Based on The Thin Man novel by Dashiell Hammett, these were witty, sophisticated romps that combined elements of the screwball comedy film within a complex murder mystery plot. In the middle of this series, RKO hired Powell and Jean Arthur for The Ex-Mrs. Bradford (1936), a breezy comedy-mystery that successfully replicated MGM's Thin Man formula. Warner Brothers responded with a similar comedy, Footsteps in the Dark (1941), with Errol Flynn playing a married stockbroker who leads a double life as a mystery writer/sleuth.

Many of the films of this period, including the Thin Man series, concluded with an explanatory detective dénouement that quickly became a cinematic (and literary) cliche. With the suspects gathered together, the detective would dramatically announce that "The killer is in this very room!" before going over the various clues that revealed the identity of the murderer.

There were also a great many low-budget "old dark house" mysteries based on a standard formula (a dark and stormy night, the reading of a will, secret passageways, a series of bizarre murders, etc.) that were plot- rather than star-driven. Some typical examples are The Cat Creeps (1930), a remake of The Cat and the Canary, The Monster Walks (1932), Night of Terror (1933) with Bela Lugosi, and One Frightened Night (1935).

The 1930s was the era of the elegant gentleman detective who solved drawing-room whodunit murders using his wits rather than his fists. Most were well-to-do amateur sleuths who solved crimes for their own amusement, carried no weapons, and often had quirky or eccentric personality traits. This type of crime-fighter fell out of fashion in the 1940s as a new breed of tough, hardboiled professional private detectives based on the novels of Dashiell Hammett, Raymond Chandler, and an ensuing slew of imitators were adapted to film.

The 1940s–1950s

With the onset of World War II, crime films and melodramas in particular suddenly took on a dark mood of cynicism and despair that had not existed in the optimistic 1930s. Eventually, this cycle of films (which cuts across several genres) would be called film noir by French film critics. Pessimistic, unheroic stories about greed, lust, and cruelty became central to the mystery genre. Grim, violent films featuring cynical, trenchcoat-wearing private detectives who were almost as ruthless as the criminals they pursued became the industry standard. The wealthy, aristocratic sleuth of the previous decade was replaced by the rough-edged, working-class gumshoe. Humphrey Bogart became the definitive cinema shamus as Sam Spade in Hammett's The Maltese Falcon (1941) and as Philip Marlowe in Chandler's The Big Sleep (1946). Dick Powell also made an indelible impression as Marlowe in the classic Murder, My Sweet (1944), adapted from Chandler's Farewell, My Lovely. The Falcon Takes Over (1942), starring George Sanders, was also based on the same novel.

Lady in the Lake (1947), from the Raymond Chandler novel, starred Robert Montgomery, who also directed. This film was filmed entirely from Marlowe's viewpoint. The audience sees only what he does. Montgomery only appears on camera a few times, once in a mirror reflection. Another Chandler novel The High Window was made into the film The Brasher Doubloon (also 1947) starring George Montgomery. This was essentially a remake of Time to Kill (1942), a Michael Shayne adventure starring Lloyd Nolan. Chandler also wrote an original screenplay for The Blue Dahlia (1946) starring Alan Ladd. The Glass Key (1942), also starring Ladd, was the second film adaptation of Hammett's novel.

Another standout film of this period is Out of the Past (1947) starring Robert Mitchum, who would go on to play Philip Marlowe three decades later. Otto Preminger's Laura (1944) is also a classic murder mystery featuring Dana Andrews as a lone-wolf police detective.

Pulp novel detective Nick Carter returned in a trilogy of films released by MGM starring Walter Pidgeon: Nick Carter, Master Detective (1939), Sky Murder (1940), and Phantom Raiders (1940). Columbia produced a serial, Chick Carter, Detective (1946). The lead character was changed to Nick Carter's son as the studio could not afford the rights to produce a Nick Carter serial. The whodunit novels of Baynard Kendrick about blind private detective Mac Maclain were made into two films starring Edward Arnold, Eyes in the Night (1942) and The Hidden Eye (1945).

The popular radio show The Whistler was turned into a series of 8 mystery films from 1944 to 1948. Richard Dix would introduce the stories and alternate between playing a hero, a villain, or a victim of circumstance. In Mysterious Intruder (1946), he was a private eye. It was one of the few series to gain acceptance with the public and critics alike. Another radio drama, I Love a Mystery (1939–1944), about a private detective agency, inspired three films starring Jim Bannon. I Love A Mystery (1945), The Devil's Mask and The Unknown (both 1946) combined offbeat murder mystery stories with atmospheric horror elements.

Chester Morris played Boston Blackie, a former jewel thief turned detective, in fourteen films from 1941 to 1949. Produced by Columbia Pictures, many were mysteries laced with comic relief such as Meet Boston Blackie (1941), Boston Blackie Booked on Suspicion (1945), The Phantom Thief (1945), and Boston Blackie's Chinese Venture (1949). Columbia also turned the Crime Doctor radio show into a series of mystery films starring Warner Baxter. Most of them followed the standard whodunit formula. Ten features were produced beginning with Crime Doctor in 1943 and ending with Crime Doctor's Diary (1949).

Another popular series featured George Sanders as the suave Falcon. Sixteen films were made from 1941 to 1949. Sanders decided to leave the series during the fourth entry, The Falcon's Brother. His character was killed off and replaced by Sanders' real-life brother, Tom Conway. Comedian Red Skelton played inept radio detective "The Fox" in a trio of comedies, Whistling in the Dark (1941), Whistling in Dixie (1942), and Whistling in Brooklyn (1943).

Brett Halliday's "Michael Shayne" detective novels were made into a series of 12 B-movies between 1940 and 1947 (starring Lloyd Nolan and later Hugh Beaumont). Mickey Spillane's equally rugged Mike Hammer character was adapted to film with I, the Jury (1953), My Gun is Quick (1957), and the influential Kiss Me Deadly (1955). Spillane even played Hammer once in the 1963 film The Girl Hunters.

With Spellbound (1945), director Alfred Hitchcock created an early psychological mystery thriller. This film, along with Fear in the Night (1947), explores the effects of amnesia, hypnosis, and psychoanalysis. Both films also feature surreal dream sequences which are essential to the plot.

Provisional detectives
A frequently used variation on the theme involved an average person who is suddenly forced to turn ad hoc detective in order to solve the murder of a friend or clear their own name. Prime examples include Jack Oakie in Super-Sleuth (1937), Ella Raines in Phantom Lady (1944), Lucille Ball in both The Dark Corner (1946) and Lured (1947), Alan Ladd in the aforementioned The Blue Dahlia as well as Calcutta (1947), George Raft in Johnny Angel (1945), June Vincent and Dan Duryea in Black Angel (1946), Humphrey Bogart in Dead Reckoning (1947), and Dick Powell in Cry Danger (1951).

Perhaps the last word in this subgenre is D.O.A. (1950), where a man dying from a slow-acting poison has to solve his own murder in the hours he has left. This film was remade in 1969 as Color Me Dead and again as D.O.A. in 1988.

Also among this group, the issue of racism as motive for murder is central to Crossfire (1947), Bad Day at Black Rock (1954), and A Soldier's Story (1984).

Ten Little Indians
Agatha Christie's novel Ten Little Indians (1939, originally Ten Little Niggers, later changed again to And Then There Were None) presented the concept of a mysterious killer preying on a group of strangers trapped at an isolated location (in this case, Indian Island). This was made into And Then There Were None (1945), directed by the French exile René Clair. Three more film versions, all titled Ten Little Indians, were released in 1965, 1974, and 1989 along with the 1987 Russian film Desyat Negrityat.

This premise has been used countless times, especially in "old dark house" genre horror films. A few examples include Five Dolls for an August Moon (1970) directed by Mario Bava, Identity (2003), Mindhunters (2004), made-for-television films (Dead Man's Island, 1996), a miniseries (Harper's Island, 2009), and episodic television such as The Avengers ("The Superlative Seven"), The Wild Wild West ("The Night of The Tottering Tontine") both from 1967, and Remington Steele ("Steele Trap") in 1982.

Revival and revisionist era: 1960s–1970s
The 1960s and 1970s saw a neo-noir resurgence of the hardboiled detective film (and gritty police drama), based on the classic films of the past. These fall into three basic categories: modern updates of old films and novels, atmospheric period piece films set in the 1930s and 1940s, and new, contemporary detective stories that pay homage to the past.

Classics made contemporary
Veteran private eye Philip Marlowe returned as a modern-day sleuth in Marlowe (1969) played by James Garner (based on Chandler's The Little Sister), and in Robert Altman's revisionist The Long Goodbye (1973) played by Elliott Gould. Robert Mitchum played Marlowe in the remake of The Big Sleep (1978) set in contemporary London. Paul Newman portrays a modernized Lew Archer (changed to Harper) in Harper (1966) and The Drowning Pool (1976), based on Ross Macdonald's 1949–50 novels.

Craig Stevens reprised his role as suave private eye Peter Gunn in Gunn (1967), a sixties-mod update of his atmospheric, film noir Peter Gunn TV series (1958–61). Bulldog Drummond returned as a contemporary sleuth in Deadlier Than the Male (1967) and Some Girls Do (1969). Both films were produced in the extravagant style of a James Bond espionage yarn. The remake of I, the Jury (1982) brought back Mike Hammer (revived again in the 1984–87 television series, Mickey Spillane's Mike Hammer). Kiss Kiss Bang Bang (2005) is a modernized adaptation of Brett Halliday's 1941 Michael Shayne novel Bodies Are Where You Find Them.

The old-fashioned whodunit formula from the 1930s was given a fresh update in The List of Adrian Messenger (1963), Sleuth (1972), The Last of Sheila (1973), and the comedy Who Is Killing the Great Chefs of Europe? (1978).

The early films of Brian De Palma include the slasher comedy Murder a la Mod (1968), the Hitchcock-inspired Sisters (1973), and Obsession (1976), a remake of Hitchcock's 1958 classic Vertigo. The influence of Hitchcock emerged in several French thrillers, especially The Champagne Murders (1967) directed by Claude Chabrol and The Bride Wore Black (1968) by François Truffaut.

Period films
The many period films set in the 1930s and 1940s are led by Roman Polanski's classic Chinatown (1974) starring Jack Nicholson and its belated sequel, The Two Jakes (1990), which Nicholson also directed. Robert Mitchum played Marlowe for the first time in Farewell, My Lovely (1975), perhaps the most faithful adaptation of this often-filmed book. The obscure Chandler (1972) is set in the 1940s but has nothing to do with Raymond Chandler's writings. The lighthearted Peeper (1975) is set in 1940s Los Angeles. The television film Goodnight, My Love (1972) with Richard Boone and two short-lived TV series, Banyon (1972–73) and City of Angels (1976) were also set in the 1930s and pay tribute to the Sam Spade/Philip Marlowe model. And the television film Who Is the Black Dahlia? (1975) recreates the true unsolved murder case from 1947.

Agatha Christie's elegant Murder on the Orient Express (1974) and Death on the Nile (1978) were colorful, lavish productions rich in 1930s period detail. Earlier, a series of lighthearted Miss Marple mysteries were loosely adapted from Christie's novels. Margaret Rutherford starred in Murder, She Said (1961), Murder Most Foul (1964), Murder Ahoy! (1965), and did a humorous cameo appearance as Marple in the Hercule Poirot mystery The Alphabet Murders (1965).

The evergreen Sherlock Holmes was given a revisionist treatment in Billy Wilder's The Private Life of Sherlock Holmes (1970). In The Seven Percent Solution (1976), Dr. Sigmund Freud himself cures Holmes of his drug addiction. And two films, A Study in Terror (1965) and Murder by Decree (1979), which includes scenes of lurid gore, put Holmes in pursuit of the mysterious real-life serial murderer Jack the Ripper. The definitive and most faithful adaptation of the original stories was done by the British TV series The Adventures of Sherlock Holmes starring Jeremy Brett as Holmes and David Burke as Watson, in 41 episodes which ran from 1984 to 1994.

Later Holmes films are often inventions that have little or nothing to do with the original Arthur Conan Doyle stories, such as Young Sherlock Holmes (1985), produced by Steven Spielberg's Amblin Entertainment, which puts the teenage sleuth in an action-adventure story replete with computer-generated special effects. The reinvention of Holmes has continued as evidenced by the revamped, big-budget Warner Bros. series directed by Guy Ritchie. In Sherlock Holmes (2009) and Sherlock Holmes: A Game of Shadows (2011), the cerebral detective (played by Robert Downey Jr.) is transformed into an athletic (and romantic) action hero in a steampunk fantasy version of Victorian England.

The New Wave
The New Wave of modern detective films may well begin with Jean-Luc Godard's offbeat Alphaville (1965) with its traditional, raincoat-and-fedora private eye placed in a futuristic, science fiction-based story. The film is part homage, part parody of the detective genre. Godard followed this with Made in U.S.A. (1966), an ironic, unconventional murder mystery of sorts that lightly references the Howard Hawks classic The Big Sleep.

Frank Sinatra is a cynical, Bogart-like gumshoe in Tony Rome (1967) and its sequel Lady in Cement (1968) — and a tough police investigator in The Detective (1968). John D. MacDonald wrote 21 Travis McGee novels, but only one, Darker than Amber (1970) was filmed. George Peppard is a traditional private detective in P.J. (1968). Kirk Douglas is an ex-cop turned private sleuth/body guard in the more light-hearted A Lovely Way to Die (1968). Robert Culp and Bill Cosby are hard-luck private eyes in the downbeat and violent Hickey & Boggs (1972). Burt Reynolds plays a tongue-in-cheek Shamus (1973), and Burt Lancaster is a retired cop turned sleuth in The Midnight Man (1974). Two of the finest examples star Gene Hackman in The Conversation (1974) and Night Moves (1975).

The blaxploitation B-movie industry adopted the standard private detective format for several action-mysteries such as Trouble Man (1972), Black Eye (1974), Sheba, Baby (1975) starring Pam Grier, and Velvet Smooth (1976).

Brick (2005), written and directed by Rian Johnson, is a unique homage bordering on parody which brings the terse, slang-filled dialog of Raymond Chandler to a modern-day California high school where a teenage sleuth investigates a murder connected to a drug ring.

Noteworthy police detective dramas of the period include The French film The Sleeping Car Murders (1965), In the Heat of the Night (winner of five Academy Awards, including Best Picture in 1967), Bullitt, Madigan (both 1968), Klute (1971), Electra Glide in Blue (1973), and two non-mysteries: Dirty Harry, and The French Connection (both 1971). The Parallax View (1974) is the first murder mystery structured around political assassinations and high-level conspiracies in America.

Memory loss mysteries
Using amnesia as a central plot device in mysteries began in 1936 with Two in the Dark (remade as Two O'Clock Courage, 1945),
followed by Crossroads (1942) starring William Powell, Crime Doctor (1943), The Power of the Whistler (1945), and Somewhere in the Night (1946).

In the 1960s, amnesia stories had a resurgence in the mystery-thriller genre. Here, the protagonist loses his pre-existing memories after some mental or physical trauma and embarks on a quest to recover his identity. At the same time, he finds himself at the center of a mysterious conspiracy involving murder, espionage, or both. Films in this category include Mirage with Gregory Peck, The Third Day starring George Peppard, the British film Hysteria from Hammer Films (all from 1965), Mister Buddwing (1966) with James Garner, and Jigsaw (1968), a remake of Mirage.

Concurrently, the hero-gets-amnesia story became a frequently used television cliche. There were two series, the western A Man Called Shenandoah (1965–1966), and the contemporary drama Coronet Blue (filmed 1965, broadcast 1967), both about a man with no memories. Numerous crime-dramas, adventure shows, and comedies featured episodes in which the lead character has temporary amnesia. These include The Addams Family, The Munsters (both 1965),The Man from U.N.C.L.E. (1966), Get Smart (1967), The Wild Wild West, The Big Valley, Star Trek (all from 1968), It Takes a Thief (1969), The Mod Squad (1971), Hawaii Five-O (1972), Gunsmoke (1973), and Charlie's Angels (1978). By the end of the 1970s, this now shop-worn plot device became dormant once again until resurfacing in a spate of mystery thrillers in the 1990s (see the Psychological thriller section below).

Italian Giallo thrillers
In Italy, a new type of controversial horror-based thriller called the Giallo film (which began in the 1960s) became a popular and influential genre by the early 1970s. These films, which often contain elements of gothic horror, usually involve ordinary people forced to solve a series of bizarre murders. (Police procedurals generally belong to the sister genre Krimi, a German cycle inspired by Edgar Wallace novels). The stories tend to center around a series of grisly murder sequences with shocking grand guignol style gore, sometimes mixed with sadistic eroticism (the victims often being beautiful women). The villains are usually mysterious, psychopathic serial killers (often wearing masks or disguises) who are eventually hunted down by the police and/or an average person turned sleuth. The first important film in this genre is Blood and Black Lace (1964) directed by Mario Bava.

Some examples that follow a standard murder mystery format include Five Dolls for an August Moon (1970) by Mario Bava, three by director Dario Argento: The Cat o' Nine Tails, Four Flies on Grey Velvet (both 1971), and Deep Red (1975) – as well as A Lizard in a Woman's Skin (1971), The Strange Vice of Mrs. Wardh (1971), Black Belly of the Tarantula (1971), Who Saw Her Die? (1972), What Have You Done to Solange? (1972), Casa d'appuntamento (aka The French Sex Murders, 1972), and The Red Queen Kills Seven Times (1972).

The Giallo style has had an enduring influence on horror films in general as well as the subgenre slasher and splatter films that would soon follow. Early examples of this influence can be seen in the British Circus of Fear (1966), based on an Edgar Wallace novel, Berserk! (1967), and the American mystery-thrillers No Way to Treat a Lady (1968), Klute (1971), Pretty Maids All in a Row (1971), based on an Italian novel, Eyes of Laura Mars (1978), and Hitchcock's Frenzy (1972).

From Blowup to Blow Out
One mystery film stands out in a category by itself. Michelangelo Antonioni's provocative Blowup (1966) is a unique anti-whodunit symbolizing the aimless hedonism of the 1960s. A swinging London photographer uncovers clues to a murder, but solving the crime is rendered irrelevant in a society where no one really cares. This contrasts sharply with the ending of The Maltese Falcon where Sam Spade solves the murder of his partner, Miles Archer. He sacrifices the woman he's fallen for, not because he was fond of Archer (he wasn't), but because it's the right thing to do.

In 1981, Brian De Palma remade this as Blow Out, turning it into a more traditional political thriller. In the DVD audio commentary for The Conversation, director Francis Ford Coppola revealed that Blowup was a major source of inspiration for that film.

Electra Glide in Blue (1973) is another rare example of a murder-mystery plot used as a vehicle for a story concerning greater issues. In this case, disillusionment and the death of dreams and idealism in a world full of immorality.

The 1980s to the present
Since the mid-1970s, only a handful of films with private detectives have been produced. These include I, the Jury, Angel Heart, Hollywood Harry, The Two Jakes, Devil in a Blue Dress, Pure Luck, Under Suspicion, Twilight with Paul Newman, and Ben Affleck's Gone Baby Gone.

Raymond Chandler's original Philip Marlowe short stories from the '30s (which he later expanded into novels) were adapted by the HBO cable network into eleven one-hour episodes for cable television. The series, Philip Marlowe: Private Eye (1983–1986), starred Powers Boothe as the hard-bitten detective.

Films with female detectives have not fared well. Kathleen Turner as private eye V.I. Warshawski (1991), was to be the start of a new franchise based on the book series by Sara Paretsky, but the film was a box-office failure. Plans to turn the Honey West novels into a film have been in and out of development for over a decade with no film in sight.

Since 1980, ten films based on the ever-popular novels of Agatha Christie have been released. Two with eccentric sleuth Hercule Poirot, Evil Under the Sun (1982), Appointment with Death (1988), and one with Miss Marple The Mirror Crack'd (1980). Christie herself became the subject of a mystery film in 1979's Agatha starring Vanessa Redgrave. The film was a fictional speculation on her famous 11-day disappearance in 1926.

Military mysteries and police procedurals
Complex murder mysteries related to military men began with Crossfire (1947). More recent examples include A Soldier's Story (1984), No Way Out (1987), The Presidio (1988), A Few Good Men (1992), Courage Under Fire (1996), The General's Daughter (1999), and Basic (2003).

The police procedural film, often with a surprise twist ending, has also remained a vital format with Cruising (1980), Gorky Park (1983), Tightrope (1984), The Dead Pool (1988), Mississippi Burning (1988), Mortal Thoughts (1991), Rising Sun (1993), Striking Distance (1993), The Usual Suspects (1995), Lone Star (1996), Under Suspicion (2000), Blood Work (2002), Mystic River (2003), Mindhunters (2004), In the Valley of Elah (2007), and Righteous Kill (2008).

The political thriller involving murder, cover-ups, and high-level conspiracies is represented by such films as JFK (1991), Murder at 1600 (1997), Enemy of the State (1998), State of Play (2009), and Madras Cafe (2013).

Thrillers
In the 1990s and early 2000s, many horror films and thrillers started to blend mystery and suspense into stories centered around clever, sociopathic serial killers or various mysterious supernatural occurrences. The Hannibal Lecter novels by Thomas Harris have inspired four films, Manhunter (1986), the Academy Award-winning The Silence of the Lambs (1991), Hannibal (2001), and Red Dragon (2002). 

Other psychological thriller films in which this blend occurs include When the Bough Breaks (1994), Seven (1995), Kiss the Girls (1997), adapted from the James Patterson novel, The Bone Collector (1999), Mercy (2000), Along Came a Spider (2001), also by Patterson, Insomnia (2002), Secret Window (2004), The Machinist (2004), The Number 23 (2006),, Taking Lives (2004) and Old (2021).

The 2007 film Zodiac is an account of the real hunt for a serial killer in the San Francisco area in the late-1960s and early 1970s. Contemporary real-life serial killings have been portrayed in The Alphabet Killer, Ed Gein, Gacy, Ted Bundy and Dahmer. The French period-piece film Brotherhood of the Wolf (2001) examines a series of killings that took place in France in the 18th century.

In many modern day mystery films, everyday characters (such as fathers, mothers, teens, business people, etc.) are dragged into a dangerous conflict or a mysterious situation, either by fate or their own curiosity. Common elements in these stories include searching for a missing person (a friend or family member) as in Flightplan (2005) with Jodie Foster, while being surrounded by red herrings, espionage, criminal or political conspiracies, and friends/relatives with a secret past or a double life.

The retrograde amnesia plot also resurfaced in a new wave of mysteries where discovering the lead character's true identity and/or history forms the core of the story. Main examples include: The Morning After (1986), Shattered (1991), The Long Kiss Goodnight (1996), Memento (2000), the Bourne film series (2002–2012), and Shutter Island (2010). Kenneth Branagh's highly stylized Dead Again (1991) pays homage to Hitchcock and Orson Welles in a complex story of amnesia, hypnosis, and reincarnation. There are also science fiction thrillers such as Total Recall (1990), remade in 2012, Paycheck (2003) and The Forgotten (2005) which center around technology-induced memory loss.

Horrors
Slasher films with a mystery narrative include Psycho (1960), Friday the 13th (1980), My Bloody Valentine (1981), Sleepaway Camp (1983), Scream and its sequels (1996–2011), Urban Legend (1998), Identity (2003), You're Next (2011), the Saw franchise (2004–2010), Cry Wolf (2005). 

Supernatural films featuring a mysterious narrative include The Ring (2002), which is a remake of the Japanese horror Ring (1998), in addition to What Lies Beneath (2000), The Others (2001), The Skeleton Key (2005), The Orphanage (2006), Triangle (2009), The Uninvited (2009), Devil (2010), Blair Witch (2016), Annabelle: Creation (2017) and Slender Man (2018).

Revisionist period piece films
Period-piece L.A. police detective stories set in the 1940s and 1950s returned — with a harder edge and occasional parallels to contemporary issues — in Mulholland Falls (1996), and L.A. Confidential (1997) which was nominated for nine Academy Awards and won two. Both True Confessions (1981) and De Palma's The Black Dahlia (2006) are based on an actual unsolved Hollywood murder case from 1947. Hollywoodland (2006) explores the mysterious 1959 death of actor George Reeves, who is portrayed by Ben Affleck.

Raymond Chandler's final unfinished novel, Poodle Springs, from 1958, was completed by another author and made into an HBO cable film in 1998. Set in 1963, it stars James Caan as Philip Marlowe.

Among the few nostalgia-based comedy-mysteries are the board game-inspired Clue (1985), set in 1954, and Radioland Murders (1994), which recreates the era of old-time radio programs and pays homage to 1930s screwball comedies. Larry Blamire's Dark and Stormy Night (2009), set in 1930, spoofs the clichéd characters and plot elements of vintage "old dark house" murder mysteries.

Devil in a Blue Dress (1995), set in Los Angeles c. 1948, features an African-American private eye. The film captures the atmosphere of the hard-boiled detective stories of the past as well as the racial climate of the times.

Coming full circle, Robert Altman's nostalgic Gosford Park (2001), set in an English mansion in 1932, is an original story that revives the old-fashioned murder mystery format.

Notable mystery films
In 2008, the American Film Institute ranked the top 10 mystery films of all time:

Parodies and homages
 Who Done It? (1942), an Abbott and Costello comedy, is one of the first film spoofs of the genre.
 Lady on a Train (1945) is a murder mystery comedy starring Deanna Durbin that also satirizes film noir.
 In My Favorite Brunette (1947), Bob Hope is a cowardly baby photographer who is mistaken for a private detective (played by Alan Ladd in a brief cameo). Later that year, The Bowery Boys released Hard Boiled Mahoney with the same mistaken-identity plot.
 Abbott and Costello Meet the Invisible Man (1951), A&C are detectives out to save a man framed by mobsters.
 Private Eyes (1953), The Bowery Boys open up a detective agency after Sach develops the ability to read minds.
 Grindhouse sexploitation filmmakers also spoofed the genre. Nature's Playmates (1962) is one of exploitation producer H.G. Lewis' many "nudie-cutie" flicks. A beautiful female private eye tours Florida nudist camps in search of a missing man with a distinctive tattoo. Surftide 77 (1962) parodied TV detective series Surfside 6 (1960–1962). Take It Out In Trade (1970) is Ed Wood's softcore porn take on the Philip Marlowe films. Cry Uncle! (1971) is another sex comedy inspired by vintage private eye films. Ginger (1971), The Abductors (1972), and Girls Are for Loving (1973) are softcore sexploitation comedies featuring Cheri Caffaro as tough private-eye Ginger. England also produced the sex comedy Adventures of a Private Eye (1977).
 The Pink Panther (1964) is the first in a series of comedies featuring Peter Sellers as the bumbling Inspector Clouseau.
 They Might be Giants (1971) stars George C. Scott as a mental patient who believes he is Sherlock Holmes. He and his female psychiatrist (Dr. Watson) go on a Don Quixote-type odyssey through New York.
 Gumshoe (1971) is a crime comedy about a man so inspired by Bogart's films he decides to play private eye.
 The Black Bird (1975), critically panned comedy sequel to The Maltese Falcon starring George Segal as Sam Spade Jr. and Elisha Cook Jr. reprising his role of Wilmer Cook.
 The Adventure of Sherlock Holmes' Smarter Brother (1975), a Gene Wilder comedy.
 Murder by Death (1976) is Neil Simon's broad spoof of mystery films and Sam Spade, Charlie Chan, and Miss Marple. This was followed by The Cheap Detective (1978), an even broader spoof starring Peter Falk as a Bogart-like private eye.
 The Late Show (1977), quirky, contemporary detective story is largely an affectionate tribute to the classic Hammett/Chandler era.
 A trio of Chevy Chase comedies, Foul Play (1978), Fletch (1985), and Fletch Lives pays homage to vintage detective films and Hitchcock.
 The Man with Bogart's Face (1980), a detective has his face changed and becomes involved in a mystery that resembles The Maltese Falcon.
 The Private Eyes (1980) is a detective comedy with Tim Conway and Don Knotts.
 Dead Men Don't Wear Plaid (1982), set in the 1940s and filmed in black and white, Steve Martin plays a traditional hard-boiled detective who interacts with vintage film clips in Carl Reiner's cut-and-paste film noir farce.
 Hammett (1982), fictional account of Dashiell Hammett involved in actual mysteries that inspired his novels.
 Trenchcoat (1983), comedy about a female mystery writer who has to solve a real crime.
 Clue (1985), set in 1956, a period-piece whodunit spoof based on the popular board game.
 The Singing Detective (1986), a British miniseries about a mystery writer named Philip Marlow who is confined to a hospital bed. There his vivid fantasies of being an old-fashioned gumshoe are brought to life. Later remade as a feature film The Singing Detective in 2003.
 In 1987 Robert Mitchum was the guest host on Saturday Night Live where he played Philip Marlowe for the last time in the parody sketch, "Death Be Not Deadly". The show also ran a short film he made called Out of Gas, a mock sequel to his 1947 classic Out of the Past. Jane Greer reprised her role from the original film.
 Without a Clue (1988) comedy about an actor (Michael Caine) hired to impersonate Sherlock Holmes.
 The Naked Gun (1988) and its sequels features Leslie Nielsen as an inept police lieutenant. Based on the short-lived Police Squad! TV series.
 The Gumshoe Kid (1990), an adolescent obsessed with Bogart gets his chance to be a detective in this R-rated comedy with Tracy Scoggins.
 A Low Down Dirty Shame (1994), comedy with Keenen Ivory Wayans as a private detective.
 The Naked Detective (1996), an R-rated softcore parody of film noir with fetish model/actress Julia Parton.
 The Scream franchise (1996-), which is a satire of the horror genre, has heavy elements of the detective, mystery and crime fiction genres, and is often self-referential.
 A Gun, a Car, a Blonde (1997), a paraplegic's fantasy (filmed in black and white) of being a tough private eye in a 1950s film noir world.
 Brown's Requiem (1998), detective story based on James Ellroy's Chandleresque first novel.
 Zero Effect (1998) updates the Sherlock Holmes concept with a detective who is brilliant when working on a case but an obnoxious cretin when off duty.
 Where's Marlowe? (1998) drama about film makers following a low-level L.A. private detective.
 Woody Allen's nostalgia for film noir, mysteries, and Bogart's tough-guy persona is evident in Play it Again, Sam (1972), Manhattan Murder Mystery (1993), The Curse of the Jade Scorpion (2001) and Irrational Man (2015).
 Twilight (1998), Paul Newman stars in this old-fashioned private eye yarn that's reminiscent of earlier films in the genre as well as his two Lew Harper films.
 I Heart Huckabees (2004) offbeat philosophical comedy involves two "existential detectives" (Dustin Hoffman and Lily Tomlin) hired to uncover the meaning of life.
 Broken Lizard's Club Dread (2004) is a murder mystery film that spoofs slasher films.
 Kiss Kiss Bang Bang (2005), crime-noir comedy inspired by hardboiled detective fiction and vapid L.A. culture.
 A Prairie Home Companion (2006), film of Garrison Keillor's radio show features the recurring character Guy Noir, a Chandler-esque hardboiled detective whose adventures always wander into farce.
 In the season 6, episode 11 of Married... with Children, Al Bundy dreams he's a private detective who's being framed for the murder of a rich woman's father.
 Dark and Stormy Night (film) (2009), affectionate "old dark house" spoof set in the 1930s.

Movie sleuths
Mystery films have portrayed a number of notable fiction sleuths. Most of these characters first appeared in serialized novels.

See also
 List of mystery films
 List of film noir
 List of female detective characters

References

Citations

Sources

 Books
 Michael R. Pitts, Famous Movie Detectives, 1979, Scarecrow Press, .
 Ted Sennett, Great Hollywood Movies, 1986, .

Film genres
 
Film
Thrillers